Bart Campolo (born April 2, 1963) is an American humanist speaker and writer. He is the son of Tony Campolo, and was a pastor before transitioning from Christianity to secular humanism. Campolo is the co-founder of Mission Year and the author of several books including Kingdom Works: True Stories of God and His People in Inner City America and Things We Wish We Had Said, which he co-wrote with his father. His most recent book, Why I Left, Why I Stayed, also co-written with his father, is a reflection on both men's "spiritual odysseys and how they evolved when their paths diverged."  Campolo is known for giving impassioned speeches to young people, particularly recruiting them to be more involved in their local urban areas. He was the first Humanist Chaplain at the University of Southern California. Campolo hosts a podcast called Humanize Me.

Early life and education
Bart Campolo was born April 2, 1963 in Philadelphia. He was named for the Swiss Reformed theologian Karl Barth.

Campolo attended Haverford College before completing a B.A. in Religious Studies from Brown University.

Mission Year
In 1999, Campolo and his wife, Marty, founded Mission Year, an urban Christian ministry program. It was born out of the merger of their first organization, Kingdomworks, and Campolo's father's Evangelical Association for the Promotion of Education. Mission Year currently serves Chicago, Houston, and Philadelphia. Members of the group "live, work, ... and build intentional relationships in marginalized neighborhoods" in order to spread their message and work toward improving the lives of the poor. Mission Year offers short term (week-long) as well as year-long commitments.

Controversy over alleged heresy
Bart Campolo sparked some controversy after publishing an article in The Journal of Student Ministries titled "The Limits of God's Grace". This article, which argues that God is not currently in control of the universe and will eventually utterly triumph over evil, was perceived as heretical by many in the evangelical community, most notably by Christianity Today, who drew comparisons between Campolo and Ivan Karamazov.

Transition to Humanism
Following a cycling accident during the summer of 2011, Campolo came to terms with his growing lack of belief. He has since announced that he no longer believes in God and has transitioned to secular humanism. Campolo decided that "He’d help [people] accept that we’re all going to die, that this life is all there is and that therefore we have to make the most of our brief, glorious time on earth." Applying the tools of the trade that he refined during his Christian ministry, Campolo swapped his former beliefs for secular humanism and continued to help those in need. He became the first Humanist chaplain at the University of Southern California. In a 2014 motivational speech to students on campus, Campolo expounded on how to effectively persuade Christians and other religious people toward humanism as follows: "The question that we need to be asking is not, 'How do we prove that they're wrong?' but it's, 'How do we offer people the same values that all people want, but how do we offer those values, not supported by ancient myths or by supernatural fairytales, but how do we offer them love and goodness and purpose and mission, based on reason, based on common sense?'"

Conversations with Tony Campolo 
Bart has engaged in an ongoing conversation with his famous evangelical father since he announced to him that he no longer believes in God. They have co-authored a book exploring the issues at the heart of this conversation, and a documentary film (Leaving My Father's Faith) was released in 2018 which features the conversations between them and tell the story of Bart's journey out of faith.

Public speaking
Campolo gave a talk at the first 5 Talent Academy teaching event in Richmond, VA, on October 1, 2009. During the talk, he related stories of people he has helped in Cincinnati, Ohio, and some personal revelations regarding his relationship with whom he was working.

Campolo has also spoken at several atheist and secular events including Atheists United, Houston Oasis, Atheist Community of San Jose, Secular Student Alliance, and Sunday Assembly Los Angeles.

Humanize Me! podcast
Campolo is the host of the Humanize Me! podcast, first released on February 1, 2016. The podcast centers around his continuing efforts to encourage people to help others selflessly. As of April 2018, Campolo has published 65 episodes of Humanize Me!.

Published works

References

External links 
 
 
 
 
 

American agnostics
American atheists
American former Protestants
American humanists
American podcasters
American writers
Brown University alumni
Living people
Place of birth missing (living people)
Secular humanists
University and college chaplains in America
University of Southern California people
1962 births